This list of pre-Columbian cultures includes those civilizations and cultures of the Americas which flourished prior to the European colonization of the Americas.

Cultural characteristics

Many pre-Columbian civilizations established permanent or urban settlements, agriculture, and complex societal hierarchies.
In North America, indigenous cultures in the Lower Mississippi Valley during the Middle Archaic period built complexes of multiple mounds, with several in Louisiana dated to 5600–5000 BP (3700 BC–3100 BC). Watson Brake is considered the oldest, multiple mound complex in the Americas, as it has been dated to 3500 BC.  It and other Middle Archaic sites were built by pre-ceramic, hunter-gatherer societies. They preceded the better known Poverty Point culture and its elaborate complex by nearly 2,000 years. The Mississippi Valley mound-building tradition extended into the Late Archaic period, longer than what later southeastern mound building dependent on sedentary, agricultural societies.(Russo, 1996:285)

Some of these civilizations had long ceased to function by the time of the first permanent European arrivals (c. late 15th – early 16th centuries), and are known only through archaeological investigations or oral history from nations today. Others were contemporary with this period, and are also known from historical accounts of the time. A few, such as the Olmec, Maya, Mixtec, and Nahua had their own written records.  However, most Europeans of the time viewed such texts as heretical and burned most of them. Only a few documents were hidden and thus remain today, leaving modern historians with glimpses of ancient culture and knowledge.

From both indigenous American and European accounts and documents, American civilizations at the time of European encounter possessed many impressive attributes, having populous cities, and having developed theories of astronomy and mathematics.

Where they persist, the societies and cultures which gave rise to these civilizations continue to adapt and evolve; they also uphold various traditions and practices which relate back to these earlier times, even if combined with those more recently adopted.

Human sacrifice was a religious practice principally characteristic of pre-Columbian Aztec civilization, although other Mesoamerican civilizations like the Maya and the Zapotec practiced it as well. The extent of the practice is debated by modern scholars.

Northern America

Paleo-Indians, c. 18,000–8000 BC
Clovis
Folsom tradition
Plano cultures
Cody complex
Archaic Period, 8000–1000 BC
Paleo-Arctic tradition, 8000–5000 BC, Alaska and Yukon 
Watson Brake and Lower Mississippi Valley mounds sites, 3500 BC–2800 BC, Louisiana, Mississippi and Florida
Poverty Point culture, 2200 BC–700 BC, Lower Mississippi Valley and surrounding Gulf coast
Post-archaic period, 1000 BC–onward
Southwest:
Ancestral Pueblo culture, 1200 BC–1300 AD, Utah, Arizona, Colorado, New Mexico—one of these cultural groups referred to as Anasazi
Fremont culture, 1 AD–1300 AD,  Utah and parts of Nevada, Idaho and Colorado
Hohokam, 1 AD–1450 AD, Arizona
Eastern Woodlands
Woodland period, 1000 BC–1000 AD
Adena, 1000–200 BC, Ohio, Indiana, West Virginia, Kentucky, and parts of Pennsylvania and New York.
Hopewell culture, 200 BC–500 AD, Southeastern Canada and eastern United States
Troyville culture, 400–700 AD, Louisiana and Mississippi
Coles Creek culture, 700–1200 AD, Arkansas, Louisiana and Mississippi
Plum Bayou culture, 700–1200 AD, Arkansas
Mississippian culture, 800 AD–1730 AD, Midwestern, Eastern, and Southeastern United States
Caborn-Welborn culture, 1400–1700 AD, Indiana and Kentucky.
Caddoan Mississippian culture, 1000 AD–1650 AD, Eastern Oklahoma, Western Arkansas, Northeast Texas, and Northwest Louisiana.
Fort Walton Culture, 1100–1550 AD, Florida.
Leon-Jefferson Culture, 1100–1550 AD, Florida.
Plaquemine culture, 1200–1730 AD, Louisiana and Mississippi.
Upper Mississippian culture,
Fort Ancient, 1000 AD–1650 AD, Ohio, Kentucky, West Virginia
Oneota, 900–1650 AD, Iowa, Michigan, Minnesota and Missouri.

Caribbean

 Ortoiroid people, c. 5500—200 BC
Krum Bay culture, Virgin Islands, St. Thomas, 1500—200 BC
Coroso culture, Puerto Rico, 1000 BC–200 AD
Ciboney people, Greater Antilles, c. 1000—301 BC
Guanahatabey, Cuba, 1000 BC
Saladoid culture, 500 BC—545 AD
Ostionoid culture, 600—1500 AD
 Arawak people, c. 500–1500 AD
Taíno, Lesser Antilles and Guadeloupe
Lucayans, Greater Antilles and Bahamas 700 AD–1500 AD – group encountered by Columbus
Nepoya and Suppoya, Trinidad
Igneri, Dominica 500 AD, St. Croix 650 AD, Puerto Rico 1000 AD

Mesoamerica 

In alphabetical order:
 Aztec, 1325–1521 AD, central Mexico
 Formative Period, 2500 BC–200 AD, La Blanca, Ujuxte, Monte Alto Culture, Mokaya Culture 
 Huastec, 1000 BC–1500 AD, Hidalgo, Veracruz, San Luis Potosí and Tamaulipas
 Maya, 2600 BC–1697 AD, Mexican Southern states: Chiapas, Tabasco, Campeche and Yucatán Peninsula; Central America: Belize; Guatemala; El Salvador; Honduras 
 Mixe, 400–present
 Mixtec, unknown–1600 AD, western Oaxaca
 Olmec, 1500–400 BC, Veracruz and Tabasco
 Purépecha Empire or Tarascan state, 1300–1530 AD, Michoacán
 Teotihuacán, 200 BC–800 AD, near Mexico City
 Teuchitlan tradition, 300 BC – 500 AD, north-central Jalisco
 Toltec, 900–1100 AD – may be mythical 
 Totonac, unknown–1500 AD, eastern Mexico
 Western Mexico shaft tomb tradition, 1500–300 BC, Michoacan, Colima, Jalisco, Nayarit
 Western Mexico shaft tomb tradition, 300 BC–400 AD, Jalisco, Nayarit, and, to a lesser extent, Colima
 Zapotec, 500 BC–1500 AD, Oaxaca

Isthmo-Colombian area 
 Cueva people, ?–1530 AD, Panama
 Diquis culture, 700–1530 AD, Costa Rica

South America

See also

 Mississippi culture
 Indigenous peoples of the Americas – for coverage on present-day indigenous peoples
 Lithic stage in Canada
 Cultural periods of Peru
 Pre-Columbian Ecuador
 Pre-Columbian cultures of Colombia
 Classification of indigenous peoples of the Americas
 Marajoara culture
 Quilmes people
 Ancestral Puebloans

References

Sources

External links

 National Museum of the American Indian, collections search
 , Four Directions Institute

Americas-related lists
Archaeology-related lists

History-related lists

History of the Americas
Indigenous peoples of the Americas
Cultural history-related lists
Native American-related lists

it:Civiltà precolombiane
zh:前哥倫布時代